Beauce-Centre is a regional county municipality in the Chaudière-Appalaches region of southeastern Quebec, Canada. It is located on the Chaudière River, between La Nouvelle-Beauce Regional County Municipality and Beauce-Sartigan Regional County Municipality.

Established in 1982 as the successor to Beauce County under the name Robert-Cliche, Beauce-Centre is made up of ten municipalities and is mainly French-speaking. The territory is a mix of urban and rural. Beauceville, the county seat, is the most populated  municipality.

It was originally named after Quebecois politician, writer, lawyer, and judge Robert Cliche. He was born in Saint-Joseph-de-Beauce, one of Beauce-Centre's municipalities.

Subdivisions
There are 10 subdivisions within the RCM:

Cities & Towns (2)
 Beauceville
 Saint-Joseph-de-Beauce

Municipalities (4)
 Saint-Alfred
 Saint-Joseph-des-Érables
 Saint-Odilon-de-Cranbourne
 Saint-Victor

Parishes (3)
 Saint-Frédéric
 Saint-Jules
 Saint-Séverin

Villages (1)
 Tring-Jonction

Transportation

Access Routes
Highways and numbered routes that run through the municipality, including external routes that start or finish at the county border:

 Autoroutes
 

 Principal Highways
 
 
 

 Secondary Highways
 

 External Routes
 None

See also
 List of regional county municipalities and equivalent territories in Quebec
 Beauce, Quebec

References

External links
  Robert-Cliche Regional County Municipality

 
Regional county municipalities in Chaudière-Appalaches
Census divisions of Quebec
Quebec City Area